Maddicott is a surname. Notable people with the surname include:

Dan Maddicott, British children's television producer
John Maddicott (born 1943), English historian
Syd Maddicott (born 1953), British diplomat